Claudio Guglielmoni (born January 18, 1940 in Verona) is a retired Italian professional football player.

See also
Football in Italy
List of football clubs in Italy

References

1940 births
Living people
Italian footballers
Serie A players
Inter Milan players
U.S. Catanzaro 1929 players
A.C. Cesena players
Pisa S.C. players
Modena F.C. players
U.S. Massese 1919 players
Association football midfielders